Alexandru Şpac (born 21 November 1989) is a Moldovan weightlifter.

Career
Şpac won the bronze medal at the 2012 European Weightlifting Championships in the –77 kg category. At the 2013 European Weightlifting Championships, Şpac finished second. However, he was later disqualified after testing positive for Stanozolol and Methyltestosterone. As a result of the doping violation, Şpac was suspended for 2 years by the International Weightlifting Federation.

He competed at the 2016 Summer Olympics in the –77 kg event, where he finished 5th.

References

External links
 

1989 births
Living people
Doping cases in weightlifting
Moldovan sportspeople in doping cases
Moldovan male weightlifters
Olympic weightlifters of Moldova
Weightlifters at the 2016 Summer Olympics
European Weightlifting Championships medalists
21st-century Moldovan people